Ludwika Wawrzyńska (1908–1955) was a Polish teacher who worked at an elementary school in Warsaw. On February 8, 1955 she rescued four children from a burning house where they had been locked by their parents as they were leaving for work. She died ten days later, on February 18, from severe burns.

Wawrzyńska acquired a hero status in Poland and became a symbol of selfless sacrifice. She was awarded the Commander's Cross of the Order of Polonia Restituta. Wisława Szymborska and Leopold Staff wrote poems in her praise. Several Polish schools are named after her.

References

Commanders of the Order of Polonia Restituta
1908 births
1955 deaths
Polish schoolteachers
Deaths from fire